Edwin Rodney Smith, Baron Smith KBE FRCS (10 May 1914 – 1 July 1998) was a British surgeon.

He was appointed a Knight Commander of the Order of the British Empire (KBE) in the 1975 New Year Honours and created a life peer as Baron Smith, of Marlow in the County of Buckinghamshire on 8 July 1978. He served as president of the Royal Society of Medicine between 1978 and 1980.

He was a strong bridge player.

References 

1914 births
1998 deaths
Knights Commander of the Order of the British Empire
Life peers
British surgeons
20th-century British medical doctors
Presidents of the Royal Society of Medicine
20th-century surgeons
Life peers created by Elizabeth II